Aspergillus austroafricanus is a species of fungus in the genus Aspergillus. It is from the Versicolores section. The species was first described in 2012. It has been isolated in South Africa.

Growth and morphology

A. austroafricanus has been cultivated on both Czapek yeast extract agar (CYA) plates and Malt Extract Agar Oxoid® (MEAOX) plates. The growth morphology of the colonies can be seen in the pictures below.

References

Further reading

austroafricanus
Fungi described in 2012